A1 Team Korea was a South Korean motor racing team that started in two rounds of the A1 Grand Prix international racing series' final season in 2008–09.

The team fielded one car, driven by Hwang Jin-woo, which ended the rainy Netherlands feature race in seventh place, its only points finish. The racing team was run by Carlin Motorsport. Jung-Yong Kim of Omnibus Investment was registered as the team's seat holder - a requirement of the race series.

Complete A1 Grand Prix results 
(key) "spr" indicates the Sprint Race, "fea" indicates the Feature Race.

References 

Korean A1 team
Motorsport in South Korea
A
Auto racing teams established in 2008
Auto racing teams disestablished in 2009